Girard Fountain Park is a  pocket park in the Old City neighborhood of Philadelphia, at 325 Arch Street. It is open to the public during daylight hours and is maintained by local volunteers now incorporated as d.b.a. Old City Green.

The park was created in the mid-1960s after the demolition of four 3- and 4-story commercial buildings that had stood on the northeast corner of 4th and Arch Streets. A firehouse was built on the corner lots, while the lot formerly occupied by 325 Arch was cleared.

The park was improved following the 1976 grant of money from a city-held fund established by banker Stephen Girard (1750–1831) to improve areas near the Delaware River.

In 1971, a sculpture of Benjamin Franklin by local sculptor Reginald E. Beauchamp was installed atop the park's front wall. It was made of acrylic and covered with almost 80,000 pennies collected from local schoolchildren, and it incorporated a device that delivered a recorded two-minute speech on fire prevention at the push of a button.  Penny Franklin was unveiled on June 10, 1971, by U.S. Mint Director Mary Brooks. Over the next two decades, the sculpture, also known as Penny Benny, became "one of the city's best-known landmarks." But it eventually deteriorated and became a potential hazard. For a while, the sculpture was kept from tumbling onto the sidewalk by ropes rigged by the firefighters from the firehouse next door. In 1996, it was removed to city storage.

In 2003, the city's public arts agency commissioned sculptor James Peniston to replace the older work. Peniston sculpted a bust of Franklin in bronze and covered it with casts of 1,000 keys collected from local schoolchildren. Called Keys To Community, the one-ton sculpture also contains several brass nameplates representing Philadelphia firefighters fallen in the line of duty over four centuries. The sculpture was partially funded by the Fire Department and by more than 1.5 million pennies donated by schoolchildren in 500 area schools. It was unveiled and dedicated on October 5, 2007.The park itself had fallen into disrepair by the mid-1990s, and its gate was generally kept locked by the Fire Department. But a restoration effort, begun in summer of 2006 led by Old City residents Janet Kalter and Joe Schiavo, brought the park back into public use. In the wake of the sculpture's dedication, Fire Department officials consented to restoration work on the fountain.     

The work began in June 2008 and the fountain was restored to operation in August. The Fire Department formally returned the fountain to service in a Nov. 1 ceremony. Kalter and Schiavo, now incorporated as d.b.a. Old City Green, have continued to propose and execute major improvement projects, minor upgrades, and maintain the park on a daily basis.  In 2016, with financial assistance provided by Old City District, Old City Green replaced all the aging park furniture and seating area pavers, upgraded the fountain filtration and chlorination systems, and altered the park entrance walls and gate to present a more welcoming appearance.  In 2019, Old City Green proposed, funded, and executed a redesign of the north section of the park, expanding the garden perimeter, installing a central raised-planter feature, three new bench locations, and replaced the (unsustainable) lawn with a deep-bed crushed brick surface.    

In 2019, a mural, depicting the history of organized firefighting in Philadelphia and founding of the Philadelphia Fire Department and subsequent supporting organizations, was installed on the east wall of the park.  The mural, designed by Eric Okdeh, was a partnership project of Mural Arts Philadelphia, the Philadelphia Fire Department, the PFD Family Association, and WAWA.

References

External links

 A history of the park's location at jepsculpture.com.
 Photo of buildings demolished to clear parkland, November 20, 1959, PhillyHistory.org.
 Photo of rear wall under construction, December 14, 1967, PhillyHistory.org.
 Photo of rear wall under construction, 1969, PhillyHistory.org.
 Photo of rear wall, completed, March 30, 1969, PhillyHistory.org.
 Photo of front wall with Penny Franklin sculpture, May 11, 1977, PhillyHistory.org.
 Photos of Keys To Community, 3 October 2007, Flickr.com.
 Keys To Community's entry at Philadelphia Public Art@philart.net.
 Before-and-after photos of restored park, August 2008, Flickr.com.
 2009 photos of restored fountains.
New York Times description of Keys To Community,  October 9, 2013

Municipal parks in Philadelphia
Pocket parks
Old City, Philadelphia
1960s establishments in Pennsylvania